was a Japanese sculptor. Her birth name was written . She was the second daughter of sculptor Fumio Asakura and sister of stage designer and painter Setsu Asakura.

Career 
 1948 - Nitten Excellence 
 1956 - withdrew from Nitten 
 1979 - 7th Nagano prefecture Outdoor Sculpture Award
 1982 - Teijiro Nakahara Excellence Award.

Solo Exhibition 
 1960 - Bungeishunjū gallery, Tokyo 
 1962 - Takashimaya, Osaka prefecture 
 1967 - Gallery Cube, Tokyo 
 1970 - Gallery Universe, Tokyo (also in 1973, 1978, 1981) 
 1985 - Shibuya PARCO, Tokyo / Yamagata Museum of Art, Yamagata Prefecture
 1988 - Shibuya PARCO, Tokyo (also in 1993) 
 2000 - Modern Sculpture Center, Tokyo 
 2000 - Fumio Asakura Memorial Hall, Oita Prefecture 
 2003–2004 - Kitakyushu Municipal Museum of Art, Fukuoka prefecture
 2010 - Ueno Royal Museum, Tokyo

Public space collection 
 "ANNE", New Chitose Airport, Hokkaido
 "Futari", Sendai West Park, Miyagi prefecture 
 "Raleigh", Akita Museum of Modern Art, Akita Prefecture
 "MARI", Tokyo Metropolitan Government, Tokyo
 "Mari and Sherry", Tokyo Metropolitan Theatre, Tokyo 
 "Jill", Nihonbashi Plaza Building, Tokyo
 "Fiona and Arian", Education Forest Park, Tokyo 
 "NIKE", "Summer", Tokyo Sumitomo Twin Building, Tokyo
 "I am a juvenile newspaper", Arisugawa-no-miya Memorial Park, Tokyo
 "Tomorrow (Kanji: "Dinner on Sun Candle")", Tokyo Metropolitan Hiroo Hospital, Tokyo
 "Woman", Machida station, Tokyo 
 "CONNECTION", Fuchu City Hall, Tokyo
 "Nicola", street of Himeji
 "Ann and Michelle", Fuchu Forest Park, Tokyo 
 "NIKE '83", Joinus Forest, Kanagawa 
 "Nike and Nicola", Yokohama Citizens' Cultural Center, Kanagawa 
 "Michelle", Kawaguchi Western Park, Saitama
 "Raleigh", "Mary and Cathy", Sakura Station, Chiba
 "Lecture", Nagano-shi Shiroyama Park Children's amusement park, Nagano
 "Hitotsuki", Takaoka-shi Sogo-dori, Toyama
 "RAQUEL", Sakae Park, Aichi
 "Jill", Midosu Sculpture Street, Osaka
 "Flower", Hotel Grand Hill Ichigaya, Tokyo 
 "Vanessa", Hotel Grand Hill Ichigaya, Tokyo 
 "Lisa", Hotel Grand Hill Ichigaya, Tokyo

Work Collection 
 Asakura Kyoko Sculpture Collection and Waves, Photo book · Narahara Kazutaka, PARCO Publishing, 1980 
 Kyoko, Photo book, Shigeo Anzai, PARCO publication, 1985

References 

1925 births
2016 deaths
Japanese women sculptors
Artists from Tokyo